Shaikpet  is located near Tolichowki in Hyderabad, India. It is a mandal in Hyderabad District and one of the oldest suburbs of Hyderabad. It has existed for a long while now. This was a legislative assembly seat in its name, now after delimitation this area comes in  Jubilee Hills seat. It is administered as Ward No. 94 of Greater Hyderabad Municipal Corporation.

Revenue Villages of Shaikpet
Mandals and villages of Hyderabad District include:

Shaikpet 
Hakeempet
Bakhtawarguda

References

Mandals in Telangana
Municipal wards of Hyderabad, India